Nico Vascellari (born 1976 in Vittorio Veneto, Italy) is an Italian artist.  His work is a mix between performance art and sound exploration. He is represented by Monitor Gallery in Italy.

Exhibitions
Vascellari has exhibited internationally and his work was featured in the 52nd Venice Biennale and a number of other biennale throughout Europe.  

In 2012 he and Nicolo Fortuni founded Niños du Brasil, an electronic/batucada/noise band, and music remains a central park of his art practice.

Vascellari's work is part of Soho House Rome and he has collaborated with Fendi on several occasions.

References

Italian artists
Italian contemporary artists
1976 births
Living people